Francisco "Pancho" Usúcar (born 17 April 1986) is a Uruguayan footballer who plays for Bangladesh Premier League club Sheikh Russel KC.

Club career

Central Español
Usucar was transferred to Central Español in mid-2008. He played three championships with such team, and scored one goal in the 2010–11 season against River Plate.

Adelaide United
On 13 November 2011 it was announced he had signed for A-League club Adelaide United. Usúcar made his debut as a starting squad member for Adelaide United on 9 January 2011 win over arch-rivals Melbourne Victory in Melbourne. Usúcar has represented Uruguay's U-20 and U-17 national teams. He has played in Uruguay's Primera Division with Central Español contrary to reports he was never on loan to Greek Superleague Club Panathinaikos. After impressing on debut, Usucar signed a 2-year contract extension. Since arriving in Adelaide in January 2011, Usucar has made 34 appearances in all competitions for Adelaide United, consisting of 29 Hyundai A-League games and five in this year's AFC Champions League competition.

Técnico Universitario
Usúcar had attracted interest from Ecuadorian Serie A club Técnico Universitario and he signalled his interest to Adelaide United of his desire to move on. On Wednesday, 11 July 2012 it was announced he had signed for Técnico Universitario.

Career statistics
(Current as of 15 July 2013)

References

External links
 Ecuagol profile
 Adelaide United profile
 

1986 births
Living people
Footballers from Montevideo
Association football midfielders
Uruguayan footballers
Uruguay youth international footballers
Uruguay under-20 international footballers
Defensor Sporting players
Rampla Juniors players
Central Español players
Adelaide United FC players
C.D. Técnico Universitario footballers
Uruguayan Primera División players
A-League Men players
Ecuadorian Serie A players
Expatriate soccer players in Australia
Expatriate footballers in Colombia
Expatriate footballers in Ecuador
Uruguayan expatriates in Australia
Uruguayan expatriates in Colombia